Sevvanthi is a 1994 Indian Tamil-language romantic drama film direction and photographed by P. S. Nivas. The film stars Santhana Pandian and Sreeja, with Janagaraj, Charan Raj and Vennira Aadai Moorthy in supporting roles. It was released on 29 July 1994.

Plot

Cast 
Santhana Pandian
Sreeja
Janagaraj
Charan Raj
Vennira Aadai Moorthy

Production 
The film was in making for three years due to many problems. Actor Santhana Pandian (son of Aranganayagam) made his debut in the film. The lead pair Santhana Pandian and Sreeja got married during the filming of the film.

Soundtrack 
The music for the film was by Ilaiyaraaja. Lyrics were written by Vaali, Muthulingam, Piraisoodan and Ponnadiyan.

Reception 
Reviewing the film for The Indian Express, Malini Mannath mentioned that "though his fairly neat, there is not much in the film which will hold the audience to their seats". Regarding the hero of the film, she mentioned that "He is confident and uninhibited before the camera and gets his expression right. His dialogue delivery reminds one of actor Ramarajan". RPR of Kalki wrote that the one needs patience to watch this film; however he praised Ilayaraja's music and Nivas' cinematography, calling them the only strong points of the film.

References

External links 
 

1990s Tamil-language films
1994 films
1994 romantic drama films
Films scored by Ilaiyaraaja
Indian romantic drama films